The Parthenon is a large 1871 painting by American artist Frederic Edwin Church which is in the  collection of the Metropolitan Museum of Art, New York City.

Church visited Greece in 1869 and spent several weeks in Athens, where he made numerous studies of the ruins of the Parthenon that later served as the basis for the work. In 1871 a commission from the financier and philanthropist Morris K. Jesup finally allowed Church to begin work on his "big Parthenon".

The painting is on view at the Metropolitan Museum's Gallery 760.

References

1871 paintings
Architecture paintings
Hudson River School paintings
Images of Greece
Paintings by Frederic Edwin Church
Paintings in the collection of the Metropolitan Museum of Art
Parthenon
Works about Athens